The Globe to Globe Festival ran at Shakespeare's Globe from 23 April to 9 June 2012 as part of the World Shakespeare Festival, itself part of the 2012 Cultural Olympiad. The festival's director was Tom Bird.

The Globe to Globe Festival hosted 37 productions of Shakespeare's plays in 37 different languages over a six-week period. The festival was primarily intended to be an experiment with foreign language Shakespeare in the languages of London, however, it also aimed to discover how important Shakespeare is to the rest of the world. The Festival was recorded through blog responses on the Theatre's own website and on the Year of Shakespeare blog.

More than 100,000 people attended the performances, 80% of whom had not previously been to the Globe.

Performances

References

External links
Globe to Globe website
Recordings of 32 of the Globe To Globe performances, on The Space. Archived 16 October 2012.
 World Shakespeare festival: around the Globe in 37 plays, Guardian.
 Globe to Globe Festival: Shakespeare in 37 languages, Telegraph.

Shakespeare festivals in the United Kingdom
2012 Cultural Olympiad
2012 in theatre
Theatre festivals in England